Michael Flürscheim (January 27, 1844, Frankfurt/Main – April 24, 1912) was a German economist and Georgist. He was born in Frankfurt to a wealthy family. He was prominent in the town of Gaggenau where in 1873 found a factory. He had 6 children from 2 wives.  His brother Hermann A. Flurscheim (1851-1914) became a New York City retailer. His son, Bernhard Jacques Flurscheim was a chemist. His grandson, Charles Flurscheim was an electrical engineer, His youngest son Michael Edward Flurscheim Tromer, was a very important playwright and theater director in Mexico. His grandson Ricardo Miguel Flurscheim, is a designer and manufacturer of medical equipment in Mexico.

Michael Flurscheim,  the Promoter of an improved currency system, better known as the Commercial Exchange, has devoted considerable time, and a large sum of money, to the furtherance of the project, which will prove of great advantage among the trading and commercial section of the community. Both in England and on the Continent, Mr. Flurscheim has gained a wide experience of institutions of a somewhat similar character, and in the former country he was the propagator of a means of mutual exchange, which, in its development, is sure to afford the commercial facilities its pioneer had in view. As indicated by his name, Mr. Flurscheim is a native of Germany, and was born in 1844, at Frankfort-on-the-Maine. In literary circles he has won wide renown and frank respect by the publication of several interesting and instructive works, all dealing in the main with his favorite subject—social reform. Leaving school at the age of sixteen, Mr. Flurscheim entered the well-known banking and exchange house of his uncle, known as   L. A. Hahn. There he remained for four years, and removed in 1864 to Berlin, where he was engaged in a similar capacity till the latter end of the same year, when he accepted a position in a stock-broking and exchange firm in Paris. Here he extended his experience of banking and exchange, and in 1867 embarked for America. In New York he ultimately became familiar with the business of a wholesale manufacturer and importer. In 1872 Mr. Flurscheim returned to his native city, and took a prominent part in the editing and publishing of the “American News,” issued for the benefit of Americans in Germany. In 1873 he purchased the now famous Gaggenau Iron Works, then carried on in a small establishment, employing only forty men, and from that lowly stage he developed the business till it became one of the largest and most renowned hardware manufactories in the Grand Duchy of Baden, employing over 1000 hands. After disposing of this large and valuable business, Mr. Flurscheim travelled through England and France, and finally, on account of his wife's health, settled in Switzerland, where he still possesses a beautiful estate on the banks of the world-renowned Lake of Lugano. Leaving Switzerland in 1896, Mr. Flurscheim visited England, with a view to inducing the inhabitants to form an exchange currency of their own, and thus form the nucleus of a money reform in England. Having successfully planted the germ of the scheme he advocated, Mr. Flurscheim left for New Zealand, and arrived on February 19, 1898, at Wellington, where he immediately commenced his labours in connection with the Land Nationalisation and Currency Reforms. In the latter part of 1900 he removed to Auckland, where he temporarily resides, in an enviable spot in Arney Road, in the very respectable and highly favoured district of Remuera. As an addition to the many books which he has written, both in the English and German languages, the author of the well-known “Rent, Interest, and Wages,” and “Money Island, is now engaged in completing a work which he entitles “Clue to the Economic Labyrinth.”

Michael Flürscheim arrived in Wellington in 1898. He was a supporter of the single tax movement and monetary reform. On arrival he was greeted by the Single Tax Society and spoke at a meeting of the Socialist League and Trades Council. Flurscheim was a wealthy industrialist from Germany who decided to sell his business and devote his money and time to the promotion of monetary reform. Its philosophy was based on the same principles as today's green dollar systems. In October 1898, he established the New Zealand Commercial Exchange Co., Ltd., with offices at the corner of Willis and Manners Streets, Wellington. Those who joined the exchange agreed to carry out transactions without the use of money, a barter system using exchange notes. It was stated on the notes that "the holder of the note is entitled, on or within a reasonable time after presentation, to goods or services of the New Zealand Commercial Exchange Co Ltd, who are liable to supply goods or services". Flürscheim vigorously promoted the advantages of the scheme. He wrote many articles and letters to the press, published a pamphlet "Business without Gold" and launched a journal "The Commercial Exchange Gazette" later renamed the "Pioneer of Social Reform". He was convinced the exchange would flourish.

'There is nothing to prevent our club from gradually embracing all members of the community, and it is in the interests of every member to help extend the circle so as to have it embrace all trades, so that anything wanted by the members can be supplied in mutual exchange.' 
His efforts had the desired effect. Several hundred shopkeepers and trades people joined the exchange within a few months. Flurscheim left Wellington and established another exchange in Auckland, and by June 1901, it had enrolled a thousand local members. In 1902 he wrote 'Clue to the Economic Labyrinth" which he dedicated to the people of New Zealand. In this book he advocated land nationalisation, the abolition of interest and a co-operative exchange system. He also advocated the co-operative control of production and distribution.

Flurscheim left New Zealand in about 1905. He went to California, where he formed a company to assemble railway tracks across California toward Mexico for the William J. Palmer and the Denver and Rio Grande Railroad Company.

In 1910 became ill due to an insolation (solar radiation) in Coronado California, So his wife Margaret Trommer, took the decision to return with Him and their three children back to Germany.
He died on April 26 of 1912 by a Cardiac complication. He was sick, tired and exhausted due to the solar radiation, and fell into depression by news of the sinking of the RMS Titanic, and the many people who died the night of April 15 of 1912

Literary works 
 Auf friedlichem Wege, 1884
 Der einzige Rettungsweg, 1890

See also 
 His thinking made "Deutscher Bund für Bodenbesitzreform", 1888 (de)
 Adolf Damaschke (1865-1935)
 Theodor Hertzka (1845 - 1924)
 Franz Oppenheimer (1864 - 1934)

Notes

External links
 http://www.polybiblio.com/gerits/14041.html 
 https://web.archive.org/web/20060825052252/http://www.vuw.ac.nz/library/collections/jcbr/docs/april06-seminar.pdf (PDF) 
 http://userpage.fu-berlin.de/~roehrigw/onken/mokonk.htm 
 Porträt: Adolf Damaschke at www.luise-berlin.de 
  
 La vie rurale en Espagne - 1830 - 1930 - Glossaire at larhra.ish-lyon.cnrs.fr 
 The Economic and Social Problem'' 1909

German economists
Writers from Frankfurt
1844 births
1912 deaths
Georgist economists